Flávio Pereira de Barros Júnior (born 3 January 1966), known as Flávio Barros, is a Brazilian professional football manager and former player who played as a central defender.

Honours

Manager
ASA
Campeonato Alagoano: 2005

Coruripe
Campeonato Alagoano: 2007

CSA
Campeonato Alagoano: 2008

References

External links

1966 births
Living people
Sportspeople from Recife
Brazilian footballers
Association football defenders
Clube Náutico Capibaribe players
Figueirense FC players
Associação Atlética Anapolina players
Santa Helena Esporte Clube players
Moto Club de São Luís players
Brazilian football managers
Campeonato Brasileiro Série B managers
Campeonato Brasileiro Série D managers
Santa Helena Esporte Clube managers
Goiânia Esporte Clube managers
Agremiação Sportiva Arapiraquense managers
Clube de Regatas Brasil managers
Associação Atlética Aparecidense managers
Central Sport Club managers
Treze Futebol Clube managers
Centro Sportivo Alagoano managers
Sociedade Esportiva do Gama managers
ABC Futebol Clube managers
Murici Futebol Clube managers
Ríver Atlético Clube managers
Mixto Esporte Clube managers